Day Shift is a 2022 American supernatural action comedy film starring Jamie Foxx as a blue-collar father whose pool-cleaning job is a front for his work as a vampire hunter. The film is directed by J. J. Perry in his directorial debut, with a screenplay by Tyler Tice and Shay Hatten, based on a story by Tice. The film's cast also includes Dave Franco, Natasha Liu Bordizzo, Meagan Good, Karla Souza, Steve Howey, Scott Adkins, and Snoop Dogg.

Netflix released Day Shift on its streaming service on August 12, 2022. The film received mixed reviews from critics.

Plot 

Bud Jablonski is a blue-collar dad who provides for his family apparently working as a pool cleaner. His real job is hunting and killing vampires.

While at work Bud sees a man leaving the house where he's working. He silently breaks into the house where he encounters two vampires, an elderly woman and a younger man, who lives there. Following a lengthy fight, he kills the vampires and pulls out their fangs with pliers. Bud tries to sell the fangs at a pawn shop, but the prices that Troy, the owner, offers are not enough to help him with his money troubles. Bud's ex-wife Jocelyn is planning to move to Florida with their daughter, who attends a private school with high fees. In order to pay the tuition, cover his debts, and buy his daughter braces, Bud is forced to return to the vampire hunting union.

Bud enlists his old army friend, "Big" John Elliot, to help him rejoin the union. The union boss, Ralph Seeger, initially refuses, due to Bud's history of multiple code violations. He eventually is given a final chance but must work under strict conditions: He must only work the day shift, which does not pay well, and must be supervised by a union rep named Seth. Seth is tasked to look for, and report, any violations committed by Bud. Meanwhile, a vampire named Audrey finds the vampires that Bud killed. While searching for the man who killed the older of the two vampires, Audrey finds, tortures, and interrogates Troy. Before she kills him, she reveals that humans used to worship vampires as gods and plans to restore the old order by building homes and using them to establish vampire colonies so she can build an army.

Bud and Seth go hunting, and although Bud violates several union protocols, Seth does not report them after learning of Bud's aim to support his family with his earnings. After they find and destroy an unusual nest of vampires, Audrey contacts Bud and threatens his family, revealing that the elderly vampire was her daughter. Bud rushes to his ex-wife to save her while being pursued by vampires but fails to get there in time. His family is taken hostage by Audrey, and Seth is turned into a vampire. Now set on rescuing his family, Bud and Seth recruit Bud's neighbor, an outcast vampire named Heather, to help them assault Audrey's stronghold.

At the stronghold, they are joined by Big John. During the fight, John gets bitten and chooses to sacrifice himself so that Bud can save his family. Bud is no match for Audrey's superior speed and physical strength, but through a clever trick, he gains the upper hand, kills her, and saves his family. When Seeger arrives with backup from the union and tries to use Bud's numerous violations to kick him out, Seth uses his extensive knowledge of loopholes in the union's rules to prevent him from doing so. As the Jablonski family drives away, Big John climbs out of a manhole in the street showing that he survived the explosion.

Cast

Production
Day Shift is the directorial debut of second-unit director J. J. Perry. Tyler Tice wrote the script, and Shay Hatten provided a rewrite. Chad Stahelski, Jason Spitz, Jamie Foxx, Shaun Redick Yvette Yates Redick, Datari Turner, and Peter Baxter produced. Netflix announced the film on October 20, 2020, by revealing Foxx had joined the cast. Additional cast members were announced in April 2021. Principal photography was scheduled to take place in Los Angeles, California, between April 19 and August 22, 2021.

Tyler Bates has composed the film score. Netflix music has released the soundtrack.

Release
Day Shift was released on Netflix on August 12, 2022.

Reception
On the review aggregator Rotten Tomatoes, 57% of 132 critics gave the film a positive review, with an average rating of 5.6/10. The critical consensus reads, "Game stars and an appealingly goofy premise aren't enough to make up for Day Shift uninspired action-comedy hijinks." Metacritic gave the film a weighted average score of 51 out of 100, based on 33 critics, indicating "mixed or average reviews".

Michael Ordoña of the Los Angeles Times called the film a "damned delight" and said: "One would be tempted to call it the best horror comedy of 2022 so far, but it mixes so many genres it's more like 2022's best horror-buddy-cop-cartel-drama-bounty-hunter-martial-arts-action comedy (so far)." Lovia Gyarkye of The Hollywood Reporter called it "a rambunctious, strange and occasionally humorous action-thriller-comedy".

Owen Gleiberman of Variety found the film agreeable at first but "until it starts to be just convoluted enough to give you a headache, especially when the rules are applied as inconsistently as they are here". Peter Travers of ABC News wrote: "A slumming Jamie Foxx is cool to the max as a vampire hunter gunning down bloodsuckers in sunny LA. But you leave this goofy but mostly godawful action-comedy feeling pummeled, beaten down by an avalanche of sound and fury signifying the usual nothing." Brian Lowry of CNN wrote: "It's the kind of star-driven vehicle that yields obvious benefits to Netflix even if, qualitatively speaking, it doesn't deserve to see the light of day."

References

External links
 
 

2020s English-language films
2022 comedy horror films
2022 directorial debut films
2022 horror films
2020s monster movies
American action comedy films
American vampire films
African-American films
African-American horror films
English-language Netflix original films
Films scored by Tyler Bates
Films shot in Los Angeles
Films with screenplays by Shay Hatten
2020s American films